Baga Sola is a town in Lac Region on the shore of Lake Chad in western Chad. It has a hospital and a fish market, and a refugee camp for Nigerians and Chadians who fled Boko Haram. 

Boko Haram suicide bombers killed 41 people on 10 October 2015.

References

Lac Region
Populated places in Chad